The 2003 Hart Council election took place on 1 May 2003 to elect members of Hart District Council in Hampshire, England. One third of the council was up for election and the Conservative Party stayed in overall control of the council.

After the election, the composition of the council was:
Conservative 22
Liberal Democrat 10
Independent 3

Background
12 seats were to be contested in the 2003 election, but Eversley ward saw Conservative councillor Hugo Eastwood re-elected without opposition. The other 11 seats had the Conservatives defending 6 seats compared to 5 for the Liberal Democrats, with 10 of them having sitting councillors standing for re-election. The only candidates from other parties standing were 4 from the Labour Party and 3 from the Green Party.

Election result
The results saw the Conservatives retain control of the council after no seats changed parties. There were 2 close results with the Conservatives holding Fleet North by 19 votes over the Liberal Democrats, while the Liberal Democrats held Blackwater and Hawley by 16 votes over the Conservatives. This meant the Conservatives retained 22 seats, compared to 10 for the Liberal Democrats and 3 Independents. Overall turnout in the election was 28.52%.

Following the election, councillor Jan Pearson, quit the Conservative group to sit as an Independent saying she was unhappy about how the group made decisions. Meanwhile, Conservative Lorraine Fullbrook became the new leader of the council after only having been first elected to the council in the 2002 election.

Ward results

Blackwater and Hawley

Church Crookham West

Eversley

Fleet Courtmoor

Fleet North

Frogmore and Darby Green

Hartley Wintney

Hook

Odiham

Yateley East

Yateley North

Yateley West

References

2003
2003 English local elections
2000s in Hampshire